Samuel H. Cassidy (born January 16, 1950) is an attorney and has been a professor at the University of Denver since 2000, where he has taught law and ethics. He was the 43rd Lieutenant Governor of Colorado, serving from 1994 to 1995 under Roy Romer. Before taking that office, he served as a Colorado State Senator from 1991 to 1994, and was the Minority Leader of the Senate for two years.

Cassidy was president and CEO of the Colorado Association of Commerce and Industry from 1998 until 2000.

Cassidy earned his undergraduate degree from the University of Oklahoma in 1972 and his Juris Doctor degree from the University of Tulsa College of Law in 1975.

References

External links
 Cassidy for Colorado - Sam Cassidy campaign site

Lieutenant Governors of Colorado
1950 births
Living people
University of Oklahoma alumni
University of Tulsa College of Law alumni
People from Shreveport, Louisiana
Colorado state senators
Colorado lawyers